Donald Hains (27 June 1916 – 5 September 2005) was a Canadian sailor. He competed in the Dragon event at the 1952 Summer Olympics.

References

External links
 

1916 births
2005 deaths
Canadian male sailors (sport)
Olympic sailors of Canada
Sailors at the 1952 Summer Olympics – Dragon
Sportspeople from Montreal